Bridge End may refer to:

Bridge End, County Donegal, Republic of Ireland
Bridge End, County Durham, England
Bridge End, Lincolnshire, England
Bridge End, Northumberland, England
Bridge End, Shetland, Scotland
Bridge End, Warwick, England
Bridge End railway station, Belfast, Northern Ireland (renamed to Titanic Quarter since March 2012)

See also
 Bridgend (disambiguation)